Al Anderson is the name of:

 Alan Al Anderson (NRBQ) (born 1947), American guitarist, singer, member of the rock NRBQ
 Albert Al Anderson (The Wailers) (born 1950), of the Wailers Band reggae group
 Al Anderson (Canadian football) (1914–1994), Canadian football administrator

See also
Anderson, AL
 Alan Anderson (disambiguation)
Alfred Anderson (disambiguation)
Albert Anderson (disambiguation)
Alison Anderson (born 1958), Australian politician
Alexander Anderson (disambiguation)